Don Gordon (born Donald Walter Guadagno; November 13, 1926 – April 24, 2017) was an American film and television actor.  His most notable film roles were those in which he appeared alongside his friend Steve McQueen: Bullitt (1968), Papillon (1973) and The Towering Inferno (1974). Between the first and the last of those films he appeared in The Gamblers (1970), WUSA (1970), Cannon for Cordoba (1970), The Last Movie (1971), Z.P.G. (1972), Fuzz (1972), Slaughter (1972), The Mack (1973),  
The Education of Sonny Carson (1974) and Omen III: The Final Conflict (1981) as the ill-fated assistant to protagonist Damien Thorn.

Early life 
Gordon was born Donald Walter Guadagno in Los Angeles on November 13, 1926. He sold newspapers at the age of eight to help support his family during the Great Depression. He enlisted in the Navy at the age of fifteen after the attack on Pearl Harbor, convincing his mother to say he was eighteen. He won eleven battle stars.

Gordon entered drama school after the war and changed his name. As recounted after his death in The New York Times, Gordon was standing outside the drama school at Sunset Boulevard and Gordon Street, when "a classmate told him that he would never make it in show business with the surname Guadagno. The student then pointed to the street sign and said, 'Your name should be Don Gordon.'"

Career
Gordon's television successes began with a starring role in the 1960–1961 syndicated series The Blue Angels, based on the elite precision flight demonstration pilots of the United States Navy Blue Angels. In 1962, Gordon was nominated for a Primetime Emmy Award for his role as Joey Tassili on CBS's legal drama, The Defenders, starring E.G. Marshall. During 1977–1978, he co-starred in the television show Lucan, and he played Harry in the CBS drama The Contender (1980).

Later career
Gordon's last credited film work was the 2005 documentary, Steve McQueen – The Essence of Cool. Gordon was interviewed along with several others who had worked with McQueen, with whom he was a close friend and colleague.

Personal life
On February 18, 1948, Gordon (aged 21) married actress Helen Westcott (aged 20) in Oxnard, California. They divorced in 1953. He married actress Bek Nelson on December 31, 1959, in Los Angeles. They adopted a daughter, Gabrielle, in 1966, and they divorced on May 23, 1979.

Gordon died at Cedars-Sinai Medical Center in Los Angeles on April 24, 2017, aged 90, survived by his wife, Denise, and his daughter, Gabrielle, from a previous marriage. He was diagnosed with cancer shortly before his death.

Selected filmography

 Twelve O'Clock High (1949) - First Patient in Base Hospital (uncredited)
 Halls of Montezuma (1951) - Marine (uncredited)
 Let's Go Navy! (1951) - Sailor (uncredited)
 Force of Arms (1951) - Sgt. Webber (uncredited)
 It's a Big Country: An American Anthology (1951) - Mervin (uncredited)
 Girls in the Night (1953) - Irv Kellener
 Law and Order (1953) - Bart Durling (uncredited)
 The Beast from 20,000 Fathoms (1953) - Soldier (uncredited)
 Revolt at Fort Laramie (1956) - Jean Salignac
 The Benny Goodman Story (1956) - Tough Boy in Gang (uncredited)
 The Walter Winchell File "The Bargain" (1958) - Deek
 Cry Tough (1959) - Incho
 The Twilight Zone (Season 5, Episode 16, No. 136 overall) (1964) - Salvador Ross
 The Outer Limits (Season 1, Episode 19, The Invisibles) (1964) - Agent Luis B. Spain
 Combat! (Season 4, Episode 8, Crossfire) (1965) - Pvt. Stevens
 The Lollipop Cover (1965) - Nick Bartaloni
 12 O'Clock High (Season 3, Episode 9, The Fighter Pilot) (1966) - Lt. Dominic DeJohn
 The Invaders (Season 2, Episode 6, The Trial) (1967) - Charlie Gilman
 Bullitt (1968) - Delgetti
 The Gamblers (1970) - Rooney
 WUSA (1970) - Bogdanovich
 Cannon for Cordoba (1971) - Jackson Harkness
 The Last Movie (1971) - Neville Robey
 Z.P.G. (1972) - George Borden
 Fuzz (1972) - Anthony La Bresca
 Slaughter (1972) - Harry
 The Mack (1973) - Hank
 The Return of Charlie Chan (1973) - Lambert
 Papillon (1973) - Julot
 The Education of Sonny Carson (1974) - Pigliani
Columbo (Season 4, Episode 2, Negative Reaction) (1974) - Alvin Deschler
 The Towering Inferno (1974) - Kappy
 Out of the Blue (1980) - Charlie
 Omen III: The Final Conflict (1981) - Harvey Dean, assistant of the Antichrist Damien Thorn
 The Beast Within (1982) - Judge Curwin
 Knight Rider (1982) - Police Lt Dickerson 
 The Dukes of Hazzard (1983) - Frank Scanlon
 Knight Rider (1985) - Randy Cavanaugh 
 Lethal Weapon (1987) - Cop #2
 Code Name Vengeance (1987) - Harry Applegate
 Skin Deep (1989) - Curt
 The Exorcist III (1990) - Ryan
 The Borrower (1991) - Charles Krieger

References

External links

RIP Don Gordon

1926 births
2017 deaths
American male film actors
American male television actors
American people of Italian descent
Male actors from Los Angeles
Burials at Westwood Village Memorial Park Cemetery
United States Navy personnel of World War II
Deaths from cancer in California